Shelly Bereznyak (born 10 July 2000) is an Israeli tennis player.

She grew up in Bat Yam, Israel.

Bereznyak has a career-high WTA singles ranking of 790, achieved on 16 September 2019. She also has a career-high WTA doubles ranking of 650, achieved on 22 July 2019.

Bereznyak represents Israel in the Fed Cup.

ITF Circuit finals

Doubles: 2 (0 titles, 2 runners–ups)

References

External links
 
 
 

2000 births
Living people
Israeli female tennis players
21st-century Israeli women